Albert Frederick Healy (8 August 1873 – 7 March 1944) was a Canadian lawyer and politician. Healy was a Liberal party member of the House of Commons of Canada. He was born in Adelaide, Ontario and became a lawyer.

He was first elected to Parliament at the Essex North riding in a by-election on 1 March 1923. After serving for the remainder of the term in the 14th Canadian Parliament, Healy left the House of Commons and did not seek another term in the 1925 general election. He died on 7 March 1944 in San Diego, California.

External links

 

1873 births
1942 deaths
Lawyers in Ontario
Liberal Party of Canada MPs
Members of the House of Commons of Canada from Ontario